Osiedle Centrum  is the oldest, central, representative district of the Polish city of Białystok.

Points of interest
In Białystok–Centrum, points of interest include:
Branicki Palace, housing the Medical University of Białystok, and Branicki park complex
Cathedral Basilica of the Assumption of the Blessed Virgin Mary with the Renaissance old Parish church
St. Roch's Church, a Historic Monument of Poland
Town Hall (at present Podlasie Museum)
Kościuszko Square (Rynek Kościuszki) with the Józef Piłsudski Monument
Baroque Branicki Guest Palace
Cekhauz, former arsenal, formerly housed the state archive
Aleksandr Węgierki Drama Theatre in Białystok
Army Museum in Białystok 
Orthodox Cathedral of St. Nicholas
Orthodox church of Marie Magdalene
St. Wincent Sisters of Mercy Monastery
Białystok Puppet Theatre
Monument to Heroes of the Białystok region
Rev. Jerzy Popiełuszko Monument
Ludwik Zamenhof Monument
Former Masonic Lodge 
Jadwiga Dziekońska Park
Planty Park
Prince Józef Poniatowski Park
Central Park
Boulevard of Józef Bilcharski
Kościałkowski Boulevards

References

Districts of Białystok